Joe Fincham (born October 6, 1964) is a former American football coach. He served as the head football coach at Wittenberg University in Springfield, Ohio from 1996 to 2021, compiling a record of 224–51. Fincham played football at Ohio University from 1983 to 1986. On September 25, 2010, Fincham won his 130th game, passing Dave Maurer for the most wins in Wittenberg Tigers football history.

Head coaching record

See also
 List of college football coaches with 200 wins

References

External links
 Wittenberg profile

1964 births
Living people
Ohio Bobcats football coaches
Ohio Bobcats football players
Urbana Blue Knights football coaches
Wittenberg Tigers football coaches
People from Williamstown, West Virginia
Coaches of American football from West Virginia
Players of American football from West Virginia